Manamelkudi taluk is a taluk of Pudukkottai district of the Indian state of Tamil Nadu. The headquarters of the taluk is the town of Manamelkudi

Demographics
According to the 2011 census, the taluk of Manamelkudi had a population of 86,589 with 42,945  males and 43,644 females. There were 1016 women for every 1000 men. The taluk had a literacy rate of 74.79. Child population in the age group below 6 was 4,484 Males and 4,397 Females.

Rain Fall 

The town gets major rainfall during the North east monsoon period. The Annual normal rainfall varies from 300 mm to 800 mm.

Schools & Colleges 
So many schools & colleges are located in this town. Half of the pupil get their education from Government and government aided schools. But still, some well developed and equipped private schools (both Matric & CBSE syllabus)  are also providing quality education in and around the town. The town has so many engineering, arts & science, laws, hotel management colleges in its surrounding. It has a government polytechnic college, which is a top ranking one  among Tamil Nadu's polytechnic colleges. Higher Secondary School = Manamelkudi, Kattumavadi Ammapattinam Vichoor, Kottaipattinam

Hospitals 
Government hospital is located on the Sethu road (East Coast Road) and  private hospitals are available. 
Government hospital ammapattinam
Singavanam has separate Govt. Hospitals.
Sree Maadhavi hospital is located on the EC Road and managed by Dr. Elamaran .
Sree Vijay Hospitals located on the Sethu road. 
It is the one of the ortho hospital in the area. Dr. Vijay MS Ortho, Dr. Muthu MS practice in the Hospital.
Then Kalimuthu Hospital, Dr.suresh hospital,

Politics 
manamelkudi taluk is come to Aranthangi State Assembly constitutions
Aranthangi MLAs from 1952
 1952-1957 - M.Pandidurai (DMK)
 1957-1962 - M.Kalander Maideen.B.E (DMK)
 1962-1971 - DuraiArasan A (DMK)
 1971-1974 - Ramanathan Udayar (DMK)
 1977-1999 - Thirunavukarasar (AIADMK, MGR Kalagam)
 1999-2001 - Anbarasu (MGR Kalagam)
 2001-2006 - Arasan.P (MGR Kalagam)
 2006-2011 - Udhayam Shanmugam (DMK)
 2011-2016 - M.Rajanayagam (AIADMK)
 2016-may onwards - Rathinasabhapathy E (AIADMK)

References 

Taluks of Pudukkottai district